Advertising is the practice and techniques employed to bring attention to a product or service. Advertising aims to put a product or service in the spotlight in hopes of drawing it attention from consumers. It is typically used to promote a specific good or service, but there are wide range of uses, the most common being the commercial advertisement.

Commercial advertisements often seek to generate increased consumption of their products or services through "branding", which associates a product name or image with certain qualities in the minds of consumers. On the other hand, ads that intend to elicit an immediate sale are known as direct-response advertising. Non-commercial entities that advertise more than consumer products or services include political parties, interest groups, religious organizations and governmental agencies. Non-profit organizations may use free modes of persuasion, such as a public service announcement. Advertising may also help to reassure employees or shareholders that a company is viable or successful.

In the 19th century, soap businesses were among the first to employ large-scale advertising campaigns. Thomas J. Barratt was hired by Pears to be its brand manager—the first of its kind—and in addition to creating slogans and images he recruited West End stage actress and socialite Lillie Langtry to become the poster-girl for Pears, making her the first celebrity to endorse a commercial product. Modern advertising originated with the techniques introduced with tobacco advertising in the 1920s, most significantly with the campaigns of Edward Bernays, considered the founder of modern, "Madison Avenue" advertising.

Worldwide spending on advertising in 2015 amounted to an estimated . Advertising's projected distribution for 2017 was 40.4% on TV, 33.3% on digital, 9% on newspapers, 6.9% on magazines, 5.8% on outdoor and 4.3% on radio. Internationally, the largest ("Big Five") advertising agency groups are Omnicom, WPP, Publicis, Interpublic, and Dentsu.

In Latin, advertere means "to turn towards".

History 

Egyptians used papyrus to make sales messages and wall posters. Commercial messages and political campaign displays have been found in the ruins of Pompeii and ancient Arabia. Lost and found advertising on papyrus was common in ancient Greece and ancient Rome. Wall or rock painting for commercial advertising is another manifestation of an ancient advertising form, which is present to this day in many parts of Asia, Africa, and South America. The tradition of wall painting can be traced back to Indian rock art paintings that date back to 4000 BC.

In ancient China, the earliest advertising known was oral, as recorded in the Classic of Poetry (11th to 7th centuries BC) of bamboo flutes played to sell confectionery. Advertisement usually takes in the form of calligraphic signboards and inked papers. A copper printing plate dated back to the Song dynasty used to print posters in the form of a square sheet of paper with a rabbit logo with "Jinan Liu's Fine Needle Shop" and "We buy high-quality steel rods and make fine-quality needles, to be ready for use at home in no time" written above and below is considered the world's earliest identified printed advertising medium.

In Europe, as the towns and cities of the Middle Ages began to grow, and the general population was unable to read, instead of signs that read "cobbler", "miller", "tailor", or "blacksmith", images associated with their trade would be used such as a boot, a suit, a hat, a clock, a diamond, a horseshoe, a candle or even a bag of flour. Fruits and vegetables were sold in the city square from the backs of carts and wagons and their proprietors used street callers (town criers) to announce their whereabouts. The first compilation of such advertisements was gathered in "Les Crieries de Paris", a thirteenth-century poem by Guillaume de la Villeneuve.

In the 18th century advertisements started to appear in weekly newspapers in England. These early print advertisements were used mainly to promote books and newspapers, which became increasingly affordable with advances in the printing press; and medicines, which were increasingly sought after. However, false advertising and so-called "quack" advertisements became a problem, which ushered in the regulation of advertising content.

19th century 

Thomas J. Barratt of London has been called "the father of modern advertising". Working for the Pears soap company, Barratt created an effective advertising campaign for the company products, which involved the use of targeted slogans, images and phrases. One of his slogans, "Good morning. Have you used Pears' soap?" was famous in its day and into the 20th century. In 1882, Barratt recruited English actress and socialite Lillie Langtry to become the poster-girl for Pears, making her the first celebrity to endorse a commercial product.

Becoming the company's brand manager in 1865, listed as the first of its kind by the Guinness Book of Records, Barratt introduced many of the crucial ideas that lie behind successful advertising and these were widely circulated in his day. He constantly stressed the importance of a strong and exclusive brand image for Pears and of emphasizing the product's availability through saturation campaigns. He also understood the importance of constantly reevaluating the market for changing tastes and mores, stating in 1907 that "tastes change, fashions change, and the advertiser has to change with them. An idea that was effective a generation ago would fall flat, stale, and unprofitable if presented to the public today. Not that the idea of today is always better than the older idea, but it is different – it hits the present taste."

Enhanced advertising revenues was one effect of the Industrial Revolution in Britain. Thanks to the revolution and the consumers it created, by the mid-19th century biscuits and chocolate became products for the masses, and British biscuit manufacturers were among the first to introduce branding to distinguish grocery products. One the world's first global brands, Huntley & Palmers biscuits were sold in 172 countries in 1900, and their global reach was reflected in their advertisements.

In June 1836, French newspaper La Presse was the first to include paid advertising in its pages, allowing it to lower its price, extend its readership and increase its profitability and the formula was soon copied by all titles. Around 1840, Volney B. Palmer established the roots of the modern day advertising agency in Philadelphia. In 1842 Palmer bought large amounts of space in various newspapers at a discounted rate then resold the space at higher rates to advertisers. The actual ad – the copy, layout, and artwork – was still prepared by the company wishing to advertise; in effect, Palmer was a space broker. The situation changed when the first full-service advertising agency of N.W. Ayer & Son was founded in 1869 in Philadelphia. Ayer & Son offered to plan, create, and execute complete advertising campaigns for its customers. By 1900 the advertising agency had become the focal point of creative planning, and advertising was firmly established as a profession.
 Around the same time, in France, Charles-Louis Havas extended the services of his news agency, Havas to include advertisement brokerage, making it the first French group to organize. At first, agencies were brokers for advertisement space in newspapers.

20th century 

As a result of massive industrialization, advertising increased dramatically in the United States. In 1919 it was 2.5 percent of gross domestic product (GDP) in the US, and it averaged 2.2 percent of GDP between then and at least 2007, though it may have declined dramatically since the Great Recession.

Industry could not benefit from its increased productivity without a substantial increase in consumer spending. This contributed to the development of mass marketing designed to influence the population's economic behavior on a larger scale. In the 1910s and 1920s, advertisers in the U.S. adopted the doctrine that human instincts could be targeted and harnessed – "sublimated" into the desire to purchase commodities. Edward Bernays, a nephew of Sigmund Freud, became associated with the method and is sometimes called the founder of modern advertising and public relations. Bernays claimed that:In other words, selling products by appealing to the rational minds of customers (the main method used prior to Bernays) was much less effective than selling products based on the unconscious desires that Bernays felt were the true motivators of human action. "Sex sells" became a controversial issue, with techniques for titillating and enlarging the audience posing a challenge to conventional morality.

In the 1920s, under Secretary of Commerce Herbert Hoover, the American government promoted advertising. Hoover himself delivered an address to the Associated Advertising Clubs of the World in 1925 called 'Advertising Is a Vital Force in Our National Life." In October 1929, the head of the U.S. Bureau of Foreign and Domestic Commerce, Julius Klein, stated "Advertising is the key to world prosperity." This was part of the "unparalleled" collaboration between business and government in the 1920s, according to a 1933 European economic journal.

The tobacco companies became major advertisers in order to sell packaged cigarettes. The tobacco companies pioneered the new advertising techniques when they hired Bernays to create positive associations with tobacco smoking.

Advertising was also used as a vehicle for cultural assimilation, encouraging workers to exchange their traditional habits and community structure in favor of a shared "modern" lifestyle. An important tool for influencing immigrant workers was the American Association of Foreign Language Newspapers (AAFLN). The AAFLN was primarily an advertising agency but also gained heavily centralized control over much of the immigrant press.

At the turn of the 20th century, advertising was one of the few career choices for women. Since women were responsible for most household purchasing done, advertisers and agencies recognized the value of women's insight during the creative process. In fact, the first American advertising to use a sexual sell was created by a woman – for a soap product. Although tame by today's standards, the advertisement featured a couple with the message "A skin you love to touch".

In the 1920s psychologists Walter D. Scott and John B. Watson contributed applied psychological theory to the field of advertising. Scott said, "Man has been called the reasoning animal but he could with greater truthfulness be called the creature of suggestion. He is reasonable, but he is to a greater extent suggestible". He demonstrated this through his advertising technique of a direct command to the consumer.

Radio from the 1920s 

In the early 1920s, the first radio stations were established by radio equipment manufacturers, followed by non-profit organizations such as schools, clubs and civic groups who also set up their own stations. Retailer and consumer goods manufacturers quickly recognized radio's potential to reach consumers in their home and soon adopted advertising techniques that would allow their messages to stand out; slogans, mascots, and jingles began to appear on radio in the 1920s and early television in the 1930s.

The rise of mass media communications allowed manufacturers of branded goods to bypass retailers by advertising directly to consumers. This was a major paradigm shift which forced manufacturers to focus on the brand and stimulated the need for superior insights into consumer purchasing, consumption and usage behaviour; their needs, wants and aspirations. The earliest radio drama series were sponsored by soap manufacturers and the genre became known as a soap opera. Before long, radio station owners realized they could increase advertising revenue by selling 'air-time' in small time allocations which could be sold to multiple businesses. By the 1930s, these advertising spots, as the packets of time became known, were being sold by the station's geographical sales representatives, ushering in an era of national radio advertising.

By the 1940s, manufacturers began to recognize the way in which consumers were developing personal relationships with their brands in a social/psychological/anthropological sense. Advertisers began to use motivational research and consumer research to gather insights into consumer purchasing. Strong branded campaigns for Chrysler and Exxon/Esso, using insights drawn research methods from psychology and cultural anthropology, led to some of the most enduring campaigns of the 20th century.

Commercial television in the 1950s 
In the early 1950s, the DuMont Television Network began the modern practice of selling advertisement time to multiple sponsors. Previously, DuMont had trouble finding sponsors for many of their programs and compensated by selling smaller blocks of advertising time to several businesses. This eventually became the standard for the commercial television industry in the United States. However, it was still a common practice to have single sponsor shows, such as The United States Steel Hour. In some instances the sponsors exercised great control over the content of the show – up to and including having one's advertising agency actually writing the show. The single sponsor model is much less prevalent now, a notable exception being the Hallmark Hall of Fame.

Cable television from the 1980s 
The late 1980s and early 1990s saw the introduction of cable television and particularly MTV. Pioneering the concept of the music video, MTV ushered in a new type of advertising: the consumer tunes in for the advertising message, rather than it being a by-product or afterthought. As cable and satellite television became increasingly prevalent, specialty channels emerged, including channels entirely devoted to advertising, such as QVC, Home Shopping Network, and ShopTV Canada.

Internet from the 1990s 

With the advent of the ad server, online advertising grew, contributing to the "dot-com" boom of the 1990s. Entire corporations operated solely on advertising revenue, offering everything from coupons to free Internet access. At the turn of the 21st century, some websites, including the search engine Google, changed online advertising by personalizing ads based on web browsing behavior. This has led to other similar efforts and an increase in interactive advertising.

The share of advertising spending relative to GDP has changed little across large changes in media since 1925. In 1925, the main advertising media in America were newspapers, magazines, signs on streetcars, and outdoor posters. Advertising spending as a share of GDP was about 2.9 percent. By 1998, television and radio had become major advertising media; by 2017, the balance between broadcast and online advertising had shifted, with online spending exceeding broadcast. Nonetheless, advertising spending as a share of GDP was slightly lower – about 2.4 percent.

Guerrilla marketing involves unusual approaches such as staged encounters in public places, giveaways of products such as cars that are covered with brand messages, and interactive advertising where the viewer can respond to become part of the advertising message. This type of advertising is unpredictable, which causes consumers to buy the product or idea. This reflects an increasing trend of interactive and "embedded" ads, such as via product placement, having consumers vote through text messages, and various campaigns utilizing social network services such as Facebook or Twitter.

The advertising business model has also been adapted in recent years. In media for equity, advertising is not sold, but provided to start-up companies in return for equity. If the company grows and is sold, the media companies receive cash for their shares.

Domain name registrants (usually those who register and renew domains as an investment) sometimes "park" their domains and allow advertising companies to place ads on their sites in return for per-click payments. These ads are typically driven by pay per click search engines like Google or Yahoo, but ads can sometimes be placed directly on targeted domain names through a domain lease or by making contact with the registrant of a domain name that describes a product. Domain name registrants are generally easy to identify through WHOIS records that are publicly available at registrar websites.

Classification 

Advertising may be categorized in a variety of ways, including by style, target audience, geographic scope, medium, or purpose. For example, in print advertising, classification by style can include display advertising (ads with design elements sold by size) vs. classified advertising (ads without design elements sold by the word or line). Advertising may be local, national or global. An ad campaign may be directed toward consumers or to businesses. The purpose of an ad may be to raise awareness (brand advertising), or to elicit an immediate sale (direct response advertising). The term above the line (ATL) is used for advertising involving mass media; more targeted forms of advertising and promotion are referred to as below the line (BTL). The two terms date back to 1954 when Procter & Gamble began paying their advertising agencies differently from other promotional agencies. In the 2010s, as advertising technology developed, a new term, through the line (TTL) began to come into use, referring to integrated advertising campaigns.

Traditional media 
Virtually any medium can be used for advertising. Commercial advertising media can include wall paintings, billboards, street furniture components, printed flyers and rack cards, radio, cinema and television adverts, web banners, mobile telephone screens, shopping carts, web popups, skywriting, bus stop benches, human billboards and forehead advertising, magazines, newspapers, town criers, sides of buses, banners attached to or sides of airplanes ("logojets"), in-flight advertisements on seatback tray tables or overhead storage bins, taxicab doors, roof mounts and passenger screens, musical stage shows, subway platforms and trains, elastic bands on disposable diapers, doors of bathroom stalls, stickers on apples in supermarkets, shopping cart handles (grabertising), the opening section of streaming audio and video, posters, and the backs of event tickets and supermarket receipts. Any situation in which an "identified" sponsor pays to deliver their message through a medium is advertising.

Television Television advertising is one of the most expensive types of advertising; networks charge large amounts for commercial airtime during popular events. The annual Super Bowl football game in the United States is known as the most prominent advertising event on television – with an audience of over 108 million and studies showing that 50% of those only tuned in to see the advertisements. During the 2014 edition of this game, the average thirty-second ad cost US$4 million, and $8 million was charged for a 60-second spot. Virtual advertisements may be inserted into regular programming through computer graphics. It is typically inserted into otherwise blank backdrops or used to replace local billboards that are not relevant to the remote broadcast audience. Virtual billboards may be inserted into the background where none exist in real-life. This technique is especially used in televised sporting events. Virtual product placement is also possible. An infomercial is a long-format television commercial, typically five minutes or longer. The name blends the words "information" and "commercial". The main objective in an infomercial is to create an impulse purchase, so that the target sees the presentation and then immediately buys the product through the advertised toll-free telephone number or website. Infomercials describe and often demonstrate products, and commonly have testimonials from customers and industry professionals.

Radio Radio advertisements are broadcast as radio waves to the air from a transmitter to an antenna and a thus to a receiving device. Airtime is purchased from a station or network in exchange for airing the commercials. While radio has the limitation of being restricted to sound, proponents of radio advertising often cite this as an advantage. Radio is an expanding medium that can be found on air, and also online. According to Arbitron, radio has approximately 241.6 million weekly listeners, or more than 93 percent of the U.S. population.

Online Online advertising is a form of promotion that uses the Internet and World Wide Web for the expressed purpose of delivering marketing messages to attract customers. Online ads are delivered by an ad server. Examples of online advertising include contextual ads that appear on search engine results pages, banner ads, in pay per click text ads, rich media ads, Social network advertising, online classified advertising, advertising networks and e-mail marketing, including e-mail spam. A newer form of online advertising is Native Ads; they go in a website's news feed and are supposed to improve user experience by being less intrusive. However, some people argue this practice is deceptive.

Domain names Domain name advertising is most commonly done through pay per click web search engines, however, advertisers often lease space directly on domain names that generically describe their products. When an Internet user visits a website by typing a domain name directly into their web browser, this is known as "direct navigation", or "type in" web traffic. Although many Internet users search for ideas and products using search engines and mobile phones, a large number of users around the world still use the address bar. They will type a keyword into the address bar such as "geraniums" and add ".com" to the end of it. Sometimes they will do the same with ".org" or a country-code Top Level Domain (TLD such as ".co.uk" for the United Kingdom or ".ca" for Canada). When Internet users type in a generic keyword and add .com or another top-level domain (TLD) ending, it produces a targeted sales lead. Domain name advertising was originally developed by Oingo (later known as Applied Semantics), one of Google's early acquisitions.

Product placements  is when a product or brand is embedded in entertainment and media. For example, in a film, the main character can use an item or other of a definite brand, as in the movie Minority Report, where Tom Cruise's character John Anderton owns a phone with the Nokia logo clearly written in the top corner, or his watch engraved with the Bulgari logo. Another example of advertising in film is in I, Robot, where main character played by Will Smith mentions his Converse shoes several times, calling them "classics", because the film is set far in the future. I, Robot and Spaceballs also showcase futuristic cars with the Audi and Mercedes-Benz logos clearly displayed on the front of the vehicles. Cadillac chose to advertise in the movie The Matrix Reloaded, which as a result contained many scenes in which Cadillac cars were used. Similarly, product placement for Omega Watches, Ford, VAIO, BMW and Aston Martin cars are featured in recent James Bond films, most notably Casino Royale. In "Fantastic Four: Rise of the Silver Surfer", the main transport vehicle shows a large Dodge logo on the front. Blade Runner includes some of the most obvious product placement; the whole film stops to show a Coca-Cola billboard.

Print Print advertising describes advertising in a printed medium such as a newspaper, magazine, or trade journal. This encompasses everything from media with a very broad readership base, such as a major national newspaper or magazine, to more narrowly targeted media such as local newspapers and trade journals on very specialized topics. One form of print advertising is classified advertising, which allows private individuals or companies to purchase a small, narrowly targeted ad paid by the word or line. Another form of print advertising is the display ad, which is generally a larger ad with design elements that typically run in an article section of a newspaper.

Outdoor 

Billboards, also known as hoardings in some parts of the world, are large structures located in public places which display advertisements to passing pedestrians and motorists. Most often, they are located on main roads with a large amount of passing motor and pedestrian traffic; however, they can be placed in any location with large numbers of viewers, such as on mass transit vehicles and in stations, in shopping malls or office buildings, and in stadiums. The form known as street advertising first came to prominence in the UK by Street Advertising Services to create outdoor advertising on street furniture and pavements. Working with products such as Reverse Graffiti, air dancers and 3D pavement advertising, for getting brand messages out into public spaces. Sheltered outdoor advertising combines outdoor with indoor advertisement by placing large mobile, structures (tents) in public places on temporary bases. The large outer advertising space aims to exert a strong pull on the observer, the product is promoted indoors, where the creative decor can intensify the impression. Mobile billboards are generally vehicle mounted billboards or digital screens. These can be on dedicated vehicles built solely for carrying advertisements along routes preselected by clients, they can also be specially equipped cargo trucks or, in some cases, large banners strewn from planes. The billboards are often lighted; some being backlit, and others employing spotlights. Some billboard displays are static, while others change; for example, continuously or periodically rotating among a set of advertisements. Mobile displays are used for various situations in metropolitan areas throughout the world, including: target advertising, one-day and long-term campaigns, conventions, sporting events, store openings and similar promotional events, and big advertisements from smaller companies.

Point-of-sale In-store advertising is any advertisement placed in a retail store. It includes placement of a product in visible locations in a store, such as at eye level, at the ends of aisles and near checkout counters (a.k.a. POP – point of purchase display), eye-catching displays promoting a specific product, and advertisements in such places as shopping carts and in-store video displays.

Novelties Advertising printed on small tangible items such as coffee mugs, T-shirts, pens, bags, and such is known as novelty advertising. Some printers specialize in printing novelty items, which can then be distributed directly by the advertiser, or items may be distributed as part of a cross-promotion, such as ads on fast food containers. 

Celebrity endorsements Advertising in which a celebrity endorses a product or brand leverages celebrity power, fame, money, popularity to gain recognition for their products or to promote specific stores' or products. Advertisers often advertise their products, for example, when celebrities share their favorite products or wear clothes by specific brands or designers. Celebrities are often involved in advertising campaigns such as television or print adverts to advertise specific or general products. The use of celebrities to endorse a brand can have its downsides, however; one mistake by a celebrity can be detrimental to the public relations of a brand. For example, following his performance of eight gold medals at the 2008 Olympic Games in Beijing, China, swimmer Michael Phelps' contract with Kellogg's was terminated, as Kellogg's did not want to associate with him after he was photographed smoking marijuana. Celebrities such as Britney Spears have advertised for multiple products including Pepsi, Candies from Kohl's, Twister, NASCAR, and Toyota.

Aerial Using aircraft, balloons or airships to create or display advertising media. Skywriting is a notable example.

New media approaches 
A new advertising approach is known as advanced advertising, which is data-driven advertising, using large quantities of data, precise measuring tools and precise targeting. Advanced advertising also makes it easier for companies which sell ad-space to attribute customer purchases to the ads they display or broadcast.

Increasingly, other media are overtaking many of the "traditional" media such as television, radio and newspaper because of a shift toward the usage of the Internet for news and music as well as devices like digital video recorders (DVRs) such as TiVo.

Online advertising began with unsolicited bulk e-mail advertising known as "e-mail spam". Spam has been a problem for e-mail users since 1978. As new online communication channels became available, advertising followed. The first banner ad appeared on the World Wide Web in 1994. Prices of Web-based advertising space are dependent on the "relevance" of the surrounding web content and the traffic that the website receives.

In online display advertising, display ads generate awareness quickly. Unlike search, which requires someone to be aware of a need, display advertising can drive awareness of something new and without previous knowledge. Display works well for direct response. Display is not only used for generating awareness, it's used for direct response campaigns that link to a landing page with a clear 'call to action'.

As the mobile phone became a new mass medium in 1998 when the first paid downloadable content appeared on mobile phones in Finland, mobile advertising followed, also first launched in Finland in 2000. By 2007 the value of mobile advertising had reached $2 billion and providers such as Admob delivered billions of mobile ads.

More advanced mobile ads include banner ads, coupons, Multimedia Messaging Service picture and video messages, advergames and various engagement marketing campaigns. A particular feature driving mobile ads is the 2D barcode, which replaces the need to do any typing of web addresses, and uses the camera feature of modern phones to gain immediate access to web content. 83 percent of Japanese mobile phone users already are active users of 2D barcodes.

Some companies have proposed placing messages or corporate logos on the side of booster rockets and the International Space Station.

Unpaid advertising (also called "publicity advertising"), can include personal recommendations ("bring a friend", "sell it"), spreading buzz, or achieving the feat of equating a brand with a common noun (in the United States, "Xerox" = "photocopier", "Kleenex" = tissue, "Vaseline" = petroleum jelly, "Hoover" = vacuum cleaner, and "Band-Aid" = adhesive bandage). However, some companies oppose the use of their brand name to label an object. Equating a brand with a common noun also risks turning that brand into a generic trademark – turning it into a generic term which means that its legal protection as a trademark is lost. 

Early in its life, The CW aired short programming breaks called "Content Wraps", to advertise one company's product during an entire commercial break. The CW pioneered "content wraps" and some products featured were Herbal Essences, Crest, Guitar Hero II, CoverGirl, and Toyota.

A new promotion concept has appeared, "ARvertising", advertising on augmented reality technology.

Controversy exists on the effectiveness of subliminal advertising (see mind control), and the pervasiveness of mass messages (propaganda).

Rise in new media 

With the Internet came many new advertising opportunities. Pop-up, Flash, banner, pop-under, advergaming, and email advertisements (all of which are often unwanted or spam in the case of email) are now commonplace. Particularly since the rise of "entertaining" advertising, some people may like an advertisement enough to wish to watch it later or show a friend. In general, the advertising community has not yet made this easy, although some have used the Internet to widely distribute their ads to anyone willing to see or hear them. In the last three quarters of 2009, mobile and Internet advertising grew by 18% and 9% respectively, while older media advertising saw declines: −10.1% (TV), −11.7% (radio), −14.8% (magazines) and −18.7% (newspapers). Between 2008 and 2014, U.S. newspapers lost more than half their print advertising revenue.

Niche marketing 
Another significant trend regarding future of advertising is the growing importance of the niche market using niche or targeted ads. Also brought about by the Internet and the theory of the long tail, advertisers will have an increasing ability to reach specific audiences. In the past, the most efficient way to deliver a message was to blanket the largest mass market audience possible. However, usage tracking, customer profiles and the growing popularity of niche content brought about by everything from blogs to social networking sites, provide advertisers with audiences that are smaller but much better defined, leading to ads that are more relevant to viewers and more effective for companies' marketing products. Among others, Comcast Spotlight is one such advertiser employing this method in their video on demand menus. These advertisements are targeted to a specific group and can be viewed by anyone wishing to find out more about a particular business or practice, from their home. This causes the viewer to become proactive and actually choose what advertisements they want to view.
Niche marketing could also be helped by bringing the issue of colour into advertisements. Different colours play major roles when it comes to marketing strategies, for example, seeing the blue can promote a sense of calmness and gives a sense of security which is why many social networks such as Facebook use blue in their logos. 
Google AdSense is an example of niche marketing. Google calculates the primary purpose of a website and adjusts ads accordingly; it uses keywords on the page (or even in emails) to find the general ideas of topics disused and places ads that will most likely be clicked on by viewers of the email account or website visitors.

Crowdsourcing 

The concept of crowdsourcing has given way to the trend of user-generated advertisements. User-generated ads are created by people, as opposed to an advertising agency or the company themselves, often resulting from brand sponsored advertising competitions. For the 2007 Super Bowl, the Frito-Lays division of PepsiCo held the "Crash the Super Bowl" contest, allowing people to create their own Doritos commercials. Chevrolet held a similar competition for their Tahoe line of SUVs. Due to the success of the Doritos user-generated ads in the 2007 Super Bowl, Frito-Lays relaunched the competition for the 2009 and 2010 Super Bowl. The resulting ads were among the most-watched and most-liked Super Bowl ads. In fact, the winning ad that aired in the 2009 Super Bowl was ranked by the USA Today Super Bowl Ad Meter as the top ad for the year while the winning ads that aired in the 2010 Super Bowl were found by Nielsen's BuzzMetrics to be the "most buzzed-about". Another example of companies using crowdsourcing successfully is the beverage company Jones Soda that encourages consumers to participate in the label design themselves.

This trend has given rise to several online platforms that host user-generated advertising competitions on behalf of a company. Founded in 2007, Zooppa has launched ad competitions for brands such as Google, Nike, Hershey's, General Mills, Microsoft, NBC Universal, Zinio, and Mini Cooper. Crowdsourcing remains controversial, as the long-term impact on the advertising industry is still unclear.

Globalization 

Advertising has gone through five major stages of development: domestic, export, international, multi-national, and global. For global advertisers, there are four, potentially competing, business objectives that must be balanced when developing worldwide advertising: building a brand while speaking with one voice, developing economies of scale in the creative process, maximising local effectiveness of ads, and increasing the company's speed of implementation. Born from the evolutionary stages of global marketing are the three primary and fundamentally different approaches to the development of global advertising executions: exporting executions, producing local executions, and importing ideas that travel.

Advertising research is key to determining the success of an ad in any country or region. The ability to identify which elements and/or moments of an ad contribute to its success is how economies of scale are maximized. Once one knows what works in an ad, that idea or ideas can be imported by any other market. Market research measures, such as Flow of Attention, Flow of Emotion and branding moments provide insight into what is working in an ad in any country or region because the measures are based on the visual, not verbal, elements of the ad.

Foreign public messaging 

Foreign governments, particularly those that own marketable commercial products or services, often promote their interests and positions through the advertising of those goods because the target audience is not only largely unaware of the forum as a vehicle for foreign messaging but also willing to receive the message while in a mental state of absorbing information from advertisements during television commercial breaks, while reading a periodical, or while passing by billboards in public spaces. A prime example of this messaging technique is advertising campaigns to promote international travel. While advertising foreign destinations and services may stem from the typical goal of increasing revenue by drawing more tourism, some travel campaigns carry the additional or alternative intended purpose of promoting good sentiments or improving existing ones among the target audience towards a given nation or region. It is common for advertising promoting foreign countries to be produced and distributed by the tourism ministries of those countries, so these ads often carry political statements and/or depictions of the foreign government's desired international public perception. Additionally, a wide range of foreign airlines and travel-related services which advertise separately from the destinations, themselves, are owned by their respective governments; examples include, though are not limited to, the Emirates airline (Dubai), Singapore Airlines (Singapore), Qatar Airways (Qatar), China Airlines (Taiwan/Republic of China), and Air China (People's Republic of China). By depicting their destinations, airlines, and other services in a favorable and pleasant light, countries market themselves to populations abroad in a manner that could mitigate prior public impressions.

Diversification 
In the realm of advertising agencies, continued industry diversification has seen observers note that "big global clients don't need big global agencies any more". This is reflected by the growth of non-traditional agencies in various global markets, such as Canadian business TAXI and SMART in Australia and has been referred to as "a revolution in the ad world".

New technology 

The ability to record shows on digital video recorders (such as TiVo) allow watchers to record the programs for later viewing, enabling them to fast forward through commercials. Additionally, as more seasons of pre-recorded box sets are offered for sale of television programs; fewer people watch the shows on TV. However, the fact that these sets are sold, means the company will receive additional profits from these sets.

To counter this effect, a variety of strategies have been employed. Many advertisers have opted for product placement on TV shows like Survivor. Other strategies include integrating advertising with internet-connected program guidess (EPGs), advertising on companion devices (like smartphones and tablets) during the show, and creating mobile apps for TV programs. Additionally, some like brands have opted for social television sponsorship.

The emerging technology of drone displays has recently been used for advertising purposes.

Education 
In recent years there have been several media literacy initiatives, and more specifically concerning advertising, that seek to empower citizens in the face of media advertising campaigns.

Advertising education has become popular with bachelor, master and doctorate degrees becoming available in the emphasis. A surge in advertising interest is typically attributed to the strong relationship advertising plays in cultural and technological changes, such as the advance of online social networking. A unique model for teaching advertising is the student-run advertising agency, where advertising students create campaigns for real companies. Organizations such as the American Advertising Federation establish companies with students to create these campaigns.

Purposes 
Advertising is at the front of delivering the proper message to customers and prospective customers. The purpose of advertising is to inform the consumers about their product and convince customers that a company's services or products are the best, enhance the image of the company, point out and create a need for products or services, demonstrate new uses for established products, announce new products and programs, reinforce the salespeople's individual messages, draw customers to the business, and to hold existing customers.

Sales promotions and brand loyalty 
Sales promotions are another way to advertise. Sales promotions are double purposed because they are used to gather information about what type of customers one draws in and where they are, and to jump start sales. Sales promotions include things like contests and games, sweepstakes, product giveaways, samples coupons, loyalty programs, and discounts. The ultimate goal of sales promotions is to stimulate potential customers to action.

Criticisms

While advertising can be seen as necessary for economic growth, it is not without social costs. Unsolicited commercial e-mail and other forms of spam have become so prevalent as to have become a major nuisance to users of these services, as well as being a financial burden on internet service providers. Advertising is increasingly invading public spaces, such as schools, which some critics argue is a form of child exploitation. This increasing difficulty in limiting exposure to specific audiences can result in negative backlash for advertisers. In tandem with these criticisms, the advertising industry has seen low approval rates in surveys and negative cultural portrayals.

One of the most controversial criticisms of advertisement in the present day is that of the predominance of advertising of foods high in sugar, fat, and salt specifically to children. Critics claim that food advertisements targeting children are exploitive and are not sufficiently balanced with proper nutritional education to help children understand the consequences of their food choices. Additionally, children may not understand that they are being sold something, and are therefore more impressionable. Michelle Obama has criticized large food companies for advertising unhealthy foods largely towards children and has requested that food companies either limit their advertising to children or advertise foods that are more in line with dietary guidelines. The other criticisms include the change that are brought by those advertisements on the society and also the deceiving ads that are aired and published by the corporations. Cosmetic and health industry are the ones which exploited the highest and created reasons of concern.

A 2021 study found that for more than 80% of brands, advertising had a negative return on investment. Unsolicited ads have been criticized as attention theft.

Regulation 
There have been increasing efforts to protect the public interest by regulating the content and the influence of advertising. Some examples include restrictions for advertising alcohol, tobacco or gambling imposed in many countries, as well as the bans around advertising to children, which exist in parts of Europe. Advertising regulation focuses heavily on the veracity of the claims and as such, there are often tighter restrictions placed around advertisements for food and healthcare products.

The advertising industries within some countries rely less on laws and more on systems of self-regulation. Advertisers and the media agree on a code of advertising standards that they attempt to uphold. The general aim of such codes is to ensure that any advertising is 'legal, decent, honest and truthful'. Some self-regulatory organizations are funded by the industry, but remain independent, with the intent of upholding the standards or codes like the Advertising Standards Authority in the UK.

In the UK, most forms of outdoor advertising such as the display of billboards is regulated by the UK Town and County Planning system. Currently, the display of an advertisement without consent from the Planning Authority is a criminal offense liable to a fine of £2,500 per offense. In the US, many communities believe that many forms of outdoor advertising blight the public realm. As long ago as the 1960s in the US, there were attempts to ban billboard advertising in the open countryside. Cities such as São Paulo have introduced an outright ban with London also having specific legislation to control unlawful displays.

Some governments restrict the languages that can be used in advertisements, but advertisers may employ tricks to try avoiding them. In France for instance, advertisers sometimes print English words in bold and French translations in fine print to deal with Article 120 of the 1994 Toubon Law limiting the use of English.

The advertising of pricing information is another topic of concern for governments. In the United States for instance, it is common for businesses to only mention the existence and amount of applicable taxes at a later stage of a transaction. In Canada and New Zealand, taxes can be listed as separate items, as long as they are quoted up-front. In most other countries, the advertised price must include all applicable taxes, enabling customers to easily know how much it will cost them.

Theory

Hierarchy-of-effects models 

Various competing models of hierarchies of effects attempt to provide a theoretical underpinning to advertising practice.
 The model of Clow and Baack clarifies the objectives of an advertising campaign and for each individual advertisement. The model postulates six steps a buyer moves through when making a purchase:
 Awareness
 Knowledge
 Liking
 Preference
 Conviction
 Purchase
 Means-end theory suggests that an advertisement should contain a message or means that leads the consumer to a desired end-state.
 Leverage points aim to move the consumer from understanding a product's benefits to linking those benefits with personal values.

Marketing mix 

The marketing mix was proposed by professor E. Jerome McCarthy in the 1960s. It consists of four basic elements called the "four Ps". Product is the first P representing the actual product. Price represents the process of determining the value of a product. Place represents the variables of getting the product to the consumer such as distribution channels, market coverage and movement organization. The last P stands for Promotion which is the process of reaching the target market and convincing them to buy the product.

In the 1990s, the concept of four Cs was introduced as a more customer-driven replacement of four P's. There are two theories based on four Cs: Lauterborn's four Cs (consumer, cost, communication, convenience)
 and Shimizu's four Cs (commodity, cost, communication, channel) in the 7Cs Compass Model (Co-marketing). Communications can include advertising, sales promotion, public relations, publicity, personal selling, corporate identity, internal communication, SNS, and MIS.

Research 

Advertising research is a specialized form of research that works to improve the effectiveness and efficiency of advertising. It entails numerous forms of research which employ different methodologies. Advertising research includes pre-testing (also known as copy testing) and post-testing of ads and/or campaigns.

Pre-testing includes a wide range of qualitative and quantitative techniques, including: focus groups, in-depth target audience interviews (one-on-one interviews), small-scale quantitative studies and physiological measurement. The goal of these investigations is to better understand how different groups respond to various messages and visual prompts, thereby providing an assessment of how well the advertisement meets its communications goals.

Post-testing employs many of the same techniques as pre-testing, usually with a focus on understanding the change in awareness or attitude attributable to the advertisement. With the emergence of digital advertising technologies, many firms have begun to continuously post-test ads using real-time data. This may take the form of A/B split-testing or multivariate testing.

Continuous ad tracking and the Communicus System are competing examples of post-testing advertising research types.

Semiotics 

Meanings between consumers and marketers depict signs and symbols that are encoded in everyday objects. Semiotics is the study of signs and how they are interpreted. Advertising has many hidden signs and meanings within brand names, logos, package designs, print advertisements, and television advertisements. Semiotics aims to study and interpret the message being conveyed in (for example) advertisements. Logos and advertisements can be interpreted at two levels – known as the surface level and the underlying level. The surface level uses signs creatively to create an image or personality for a product. These signs can be images, words, fonts, colors, or slogans. The underlying level is made up of hidden meanings. The combination of images, words, colors, and slogans must be interpreted by the audience or consumer. The "key to advertising analysis" is the signifier and the signified. The signifier is the object and the signified is the mental concept. A product has a signifier and a signified. The signifier is the color, brand name, logo design, and technology. The signified has two meanings known as denotative and connotative. The denotative meaning is the meaning of the product. A television's denotative meaning might be that it is high definition. The connotative meaning is the product's deep and hidden meaning. A connotative meaning of a television would be that it is top-of-the-line.

Apple's commercials used a black silhouette of a person that was the age of Apple's target market. They placed the silhouette in front of a blue screen so that the picture behind the silhouette could be constantly changing. However, the one thing that stays the same in these ads is that there is music in the background and the silhouette is listening to that music on a white iPod through white headphones. Through advertising, the white color on a set of earphones now signifies that the music device is an iPod. The white color signifies almost all of Apple's products.

The semiotics of gender plays a key influence on the way in which signs are interpreted. When considering gender roles in advertising, individuals are influenced by three categories. Certain characteristics of stimuli may enhance or decrease the elaboration of the message (if the product is perceived as feminine or masculine). Second, the characteristics of individuals can affect attention and elaboration of the message (traditional or non-traditional gender role orientation). Lastly, situational factors may be important to influence the elaboration of the message.

There are two types of marketing communication claims-objective and subjective. Objective claims stem from the extent to which the claim associates the brand with a tangible product or service feature. For instance, a camera may have auto-focus features. Subjective claims convey emotional, subjective, impressions of intangible aspects of a product or service. They are non-physical features of a product or service that cannot be directly perceived, as they have no physical reality. For instance the brochure has a beautiful design. Males tend to respond better to objective marketing-communications claims while females tend to respond better to subjective marketing communications claims.

Voiceovers are commonly used in advertising. Most voiceovers are done by men, with figures of up to 94% having been reported. There have been more female voiceovers in recent years, but mainly for food, household products, and feminine-care products.

Gender effects on comprehension 
According to a 1977 study by David Statt, females process information comprehensively, while males process information through heuristic devices such as procedures, methods or strategies for solving problems, which could have an effect on how they interpret advertising. According to this study, men prefer to have available and apparent cues to interpret the message, whereas females engage in more creative, associative, imagery-laced interpretation. Later research by a Danish team found that advertising attempts to persuade men to improve their appearance or performance, whereas its approach to women aims at transformation toward an impossible ideal of female presentation. In Paul Suggett's article "The Objectification of Women in Advertising" he discusses the negative impact that these women in advertisements, who are too perfect to be real, have on women, as well as men, in real life. Advertising's manipulation of women's aspiration to these ideal types as portrayed in film, in erotic art, in advertising, on stage, within music videos and through other media exposures requires at least a conditioned rejection of female reality and thereby takes on a highly ideological cast. Studies show that these expectations of women and young girls negatively affect their views about their bodies and appearances. These advertisements are directed towards men. Not everyone agrees: one critic viewed this monologic, gender-specific interpretation of advertising as excessively skewed and politicized. There are some companies like Dove and aerie that are creating commercials to portray more natural women, with less post production manipulation, so more women and young girls are able to relate to them.

More recent research by Martin (2003) reveals that males and females differ in how they react to advertising depending on their mood at the time of exposure to the ads and on the affective tone of the advertising. When feeling sad, males prefer happy ads to boost their mood. In contrast, females prefer happy ads when they are feeling happy. The television programs in which ads are embedded influence a viewer's mood state. Susan Wojcicki, author of the article "Ads that Empower Women don't just Break Stereotypes—They're also Effective" discusses how advertising to women has changed since the first Barbie commercial, where a little girl tells the doll that, she wants to be just like her. Little girls grow up watching advertisements of scantily clad women advertising things from trucks to burgers and Wojcicki states that this shows girls that they are either arm candy or eye candy.

Alternatives
Other approaches to revenue include donations, paid subscriptions, microtransactions, and data monetization. Websites and applications are "ad-free" when not using advertisements at all for revenue. For example, the online encyclopaedia Wikipedia provides free content by receiving funding from charitable donations.

"Fathers" of advertising 
 Late 1700s - Benjamin Franklin (1706–1790)- "father of advertising in America"
 Late 1800s - Thomas J. Barratt (1841-1914) of London - called "the father of modern advertising" by T.F.G. Coates
 Early 1900s - J. Henry ("Slogan") Smythe, Jr of Philadelphia - "world's best known slogan writer"
 Early 1900s - Albert Lasker (1880-1952) - the "father of modern advertising"; defined advertising as "salesmanship in print, driven by a reason why"
 Mid-1900s - David Ogilvy (1911–1999) - advertising tycoon, founder of Ogilvy & Mather, known as the "father of advertising"

Influential thinkers in advertising theory and practice

 N. W. Ayer & Son - probably the first advertising agency to use mass media (i.e. telegraph) in a promotional campaign
 Claude C. Hopkins (1866–1932) - popularised the use of test campaigns, especially coupons in direct mail, to track the efficiency of marketing spend
 Ernest Dichter (1907-1991) - developed the field of motivational research, used extensively in advertising 
 E. St. Elmo Lewis (1872-1948) - developed the first hierarchy of effects model (AIDA) used in sales and advertising
 Arthur Nielsen (1897-1980) - founded one of the earliest international advertising agencies and developed ratings for radio & TV
 David Ogilvy (1911-1999) - pioneered the positioning concept and advocated of the use of brand image in advertising
 Charles Coolidge Parlin (1872–1942) - regarded as the pioneer of the use of marketing research in advertising 
 Rosser Reeves (1910–1984) - developed the concept of the unique selling proposition (USP) and advocated the use of repetition in advertising
 Al Ries (1926-2022) - advertising executive, author and credited with coining the term "positioning" in the late 1960s
 Daniel Starch (1883–1979) - developed the Starch score method of measuring print media effectiveness (still in use) 
 J Walter Thompson - one of the earliest advertising agencies

See also 

 Advertisements in schools
 Advertorial
 Annoyance factor
 Bibliography of advertising
 Branded content
 Commercial speech
 Comparative advertising
 Conquesting
 Copywriting
 Demo mode
 Direct-to-consumer advertising
 Family in advertising
 Graphic design
 Gross rating point
 History of Advertising Trust
 Informative advertising
 Integrated marketing communications
 List of advertising awards
 Local advertising
 Market overhang
 Media planning
 Meta-advertising
 Mobile marketing
 Performance-based advertising
 Promotional mix
 Senior media creative
 Shock advertising
 Viral marketing
 World Federation of Advertisers

References 
Notes

Further reading 

 Arens, William, and Michael Weigold. Contemporary Advertising: And Integrated Marketing Communications (2012)
 Belch, George E., and Michael A. Belch. Advertising and Promotion: An Integrated Marketing Communications Perspective (10th ed. 2014)
 Biocca, Frank. Television and Political Advertising: Volume I: Psychological Processes (Routledge, 2013)
 Chandra, Ambarish, and Ulrich Kaiser. "Targeted advertising in magazine markets and the advent of the internet." Management Science 60.7 (2014) pp: 1829–1843.
 Chen, Yongmin, and Chuan He. "Paid placement: Advertising and search on the internet*." The Economic Journal 121#556 (2011): F309-F328. online 
 Johnson-Cartee, Karen S., and Gary Copeland. Negative political advertising: Coming of age (2013)
 McAllister, Matthew P. and Emily West, eds. HardcoverThe Routledge Companion to Advertising and Promotional Culture (2013)
 McFall, Elizabeth Rose Advertising: a cultural economy (2004), cultural and sociological approaches to advertising
 Moriarty, Sandra, and Nancy Mitchell. Advertising & IMC: Principles and Practice (10th ed. 2014)
 Okorie, Nelson. The Principles of Advertising: concepts and trends in advertising (2011)
 Reichert, Tom, and Jacqueline Lambiase, eds. Sex in advertising: Perspectives on the erotic appeal (Routledge, 2014)
 Sheehan, Kim Bartel. Controversies in contemporary advertising (Sage Publications, 2013)
 Vestergaard, Torben and Schrøder, Kim. The Language of Advertising. Oxford: Basil Blackwell, 1985. 
 Splendora, Anthony. "Discourse", a Review of Vestergaard and Schrøder, The Language of Advertising in Language in Society Vol. 15, No. 4 (Dec., 1986), pp. 445–449

History 

 Brandt, Allan. The Cigarette Century (2009)
 Crawford, Robert. But Wait, There's More!: A History of Australian Advertising, 1900–2000 (2008)
 Ewen, Stuart. Captains of Consciousness: Advertising and the Social Roots of Consumer Culture. New York: McGraw-Hill, 1976. 
 Fox, Stephen R. The mirror makers: A history of American advertising and its creators (University of Illinois Press, 1984)
 Friedman, Walter A. Birth of a Salesman (Harvard University Press, 2005), In the United States
 Jacobson, Lisa. Raising consumers: Children and the American mass market in the early twentieth century (Columbia University Press, 2013)
 Jamieson, Kathleen Hall. Packaging the presidency: A history and criticism of presidential campaign advertising (Oxford University Press, 1996)
 Laird, Pamela Walker. Advertising progress: American business and the rise of consumer marketing (Johns Hopkins University Press, 2001.)
 Lears, Jackson. Fables of abundance: A cultural history of advertising in America (1995)
 Liguori, Maria Chiara. "North and South: Advertising Prosperity in the Italian Economic Boom Years." Advertising & Society Review (2015) 15#4
 Meyers, Cynthia B. A Word from Our Sponsor: Admen, Advertising, and the Golden Age of Radio (2014)
 Mazzarella, William. Shoveling smoke: Advertising and globalization in contemporary India (Duke University Press, 2003)
 Moriarty, Sandra, et al. Advertising: Principles and practice (Pearson Australia, 2014), Australian perspectives
 Nevett, Terence R. Advertising in Britain: a history (1982)
 Oram, Hugh. The advertising book: The history of advertising in Ireland (MOL Books, 1986)
 Presbrey, Frank. "The history and development of advertising." Advertising & Society Review (2000) 1#1 online
 Saunders, Thomas J. "Selling under the Swastika: Advertising and Commercial Culture in Nazi Germany." German History (2014): ghu058.
 Short, John Phillip. "Advertising Empire: Race and Visual Culture in Imperial Germany." Enterprise and Society (2014): khu013.
 Sivulka, Juliann. Soap, sex, and cigarettes: A cultural history of American advertising (Cengage Learning, 2011)
 Spring, Dawn. "The Globalization of American Advertising and Brand Management: A Brief History of the J. Walter Thompson Company, Proctor and Gamble, and US Foreign Policy." Global Studies Journal (2013). 5#4
 Stephenson, Harry Edward, and Carlton McNaught. The Story of Advertising in Canada: A Chronicle of Fifty Years (Ryerson Press, 1940)
 Tungate, Mark. Adland: a global history of advertising (Kogan Page Publishers, 2007.)
 West, Darrell M. Air Wars: Television Advertising and Social Media in Election Campaigns, 1952–2012 (Sage, 2013)

External links 

 Hartman Center for Sales, Advertising & Marketing History at Duke University 
 Duke University Libraries Digital Collections:
 Ad*Access, over 7,000 U.S. and Canadian advertisements, dated 1911–1955, includes World War II propaganda.
 Emergence of Advertising in America, 9,000 advertising items and publications dating from 1850 to 1940, illustrating the rise of consumer culture and the birth of a professionalized advertising industry in the United States.
 AdViews, vintage television commercials
 ROAD 2.0, 30,000 outdoor advertising images
 Medicine & Madison Avenue, documents advertising of medical and pharmaceutical products
 Art & Copy, a 2009 documentary film about the advertising industry

 
Articles containing video clips
Communication design
Promotion and marketing communications
Business models